Pythia was the priestess presiding over the Oracle of Apollo at Delphi. There are more than 500 supposed oracular statements which have survived from various sources referring to the oracle at Delphi.  Many are anecdotal, and have survived as proverbs.  Several are ambiguously phrased, apparently in order to show the oracle in a good light regardless of the outcome.  Such prophecies were admired for their dexterity of phrasing. 
The following list presents some of the most prominent and historically significant prophecies of Delphi.

Archaic period

Lycurgus
Some early oracular statements from Delphi may have been delivered to Lycurgus, the semi-legendary Spartan lawgiver (fl. 8th century BC).

According to the report by Herodotus (Histories A.65, 2–4), Lycurgus visited and consulted the oracle before he applied his new laws to Sparta,

Both Xenophon and Plutarch also attribute to Lycurgus the introduction of a very cumbersome coinage made from iron (in order to prevent attachment to wealth). In the account of Plutarch and Diodorus, this was also based on an oracular statement,

The supposed oracular statement in retrospect was interpreted as being fulfilled, as the gold and silver Sparta's soldiers sent home after the Peloponnesian War were to prove to be Sparta's undoing, according to Plutarch. It is not likely that this oracle was delivered, if it is at all historical, to Lycurgus himself, as coinage had not been introduced in his time.

630 BC
In 630 BC, the king of the island of Thera went to Delphi to offer a gift on behalf of his native city, and was told by the oracle:

Because the king did not know where
Libya was, he did nothing. Thera was later affected by drought, the Therans again approached the oracle who said:

Following the advice of the oracle, the Therans sought advice from the Cretans as to where Libya was and a colony of Thera was established at Platea. But bad luck still followed them for another two years, so they visited the oracle a third time. She said:

The Therans sought advice from the local Libyans who gave them a new site, and the colony prospered.

595 BC
In 595 BC, the affairs of the Oracle were felt too important to be left to the Delphians alone, and the sanctity of the site came to be protected by the Amphictyonic League, a league of 12 cities in existence since 1100 BC. In that year, nearby Kirra levied a toll on pilgrims, which ushered in the First Sacred War. After 5 years of struggle, the Oracle decreed that the site of Kirra be left fallow, sacred to Apollo. This ushered in a period of great prosperity.

594 BC
In 594 BC, Solon, the Athenian lawgiver, seeking to capture the island of Salamis from Megara and Cirrha was told by the oracle:

He did, and taking as volunteers 500 young Athenians whose ancestors came from Salamis, was successful in capturing the island that was to prove so important in later Athenian history. Solon never ceased to support and give credit to the oracle for its support in declaring the island was originally Ionian.

In framing his famous constitutional reforms for Athens, Solon again sought the advice of the oracle who told him:

As a result, Solon refused the opportunity to become a revolutionary tyrant, and created a constitution for which he, and Athens, were justly honoured. Through trial by jury, a graduated tax system and the forgiveness of debts he prevented a growing gap between the "haves" and the "have-nots". But he refused to accept the confiscations of the property of the rich, so creating an Athenian middle class. He secured an Oath from the Athenian Council of Magistrates that if they violated these laws, they would dedicate a gold statue to the Oracle of Delphi of equal weight to themselves.

560 BC
In 560 BC, Croesus of Lydia, in a trial of oracles, consulted all the famous oracles as to what he was doing on an appointed day. According to Herodotus, the oracle proclaimed:

Delphi was declared the winner. Croesus then asked if he should make war on the Persians and if he should take to himself any allied force. The oracles to whom he sent this question included those at Delphi and Thebes. Both oracles gave the same response, that if Croesus made war on the Persians, he would destroy a mighty empire. They further advised him to seek out the most powerful Greek peoples and make alliance with them.

Croesus paid a high fee to the Delphians and then sent to the oracle asking "Would his monarchy last long?" The Pythia answered:

Croesus thought it impossible that a mule should be king of the Medes and thus believed that he and his issue would never be out of power. He thus decided to make common cause with certain Greek city-states and attack Persia.

However, it was his empire, not that of the Persians, that was defeated, fulfilling the prophecy but not his interpretation of it. He apparently forgot that Cyrus, the victor, was half Mede (by his mother), half Persian (by his father), and therefore could be considered a "mule".

In Bacchylides' ode, composed for Hiero of Syracuse, who won the chariot race at Olympia in 468, Croesus with his wife and family mounted the funeral pyre, but before the flames could envelop the king, he was snatched up by Apollo and spirited away to the Hyperboreans. Herodotus' version includes Apollo in more "realistic" mode: Cyrus, repenting of the immolation of Croesus, could not put out the flames until Apollo intervened.

circa 550 BC
In his biography of Pythagoras in his Lives and Opinions of Eminent Philosophers, Diogenes Laërtius (3rd century AD) cites the statement of Aristoxenus (4th century BC) that Themistoclea taught Pythagoras his moral doctrines:

Porphyry (233–305 AD) calls her Aristoclea (Aristokleia), although there is little doubt that he is referring to the same person. Porphyry repeats the claim that she was the teacher of Pythagoras:

Herodotus at 1.66 in his history of the Persian Wars reports that the Spartans consulted Delphi about their plans to invade the lands of their neighbors, the Arcadians and their city of Tegea. The Pythia replied:

circa 525 BC
Herodotus states that during the time of the founding of the Siphnian Treasury, the Siphnians were told:

Classical Period

480 BC
In 480 BC, when Xerxes, the son of Darius the Great of Persia, returned to finish the job of conquering the Greeks in which his father had failed, the Athenians consulted the oracle. They were told:

When persuaded to seek advice a second time, the oracle gave a way for the Athenians to escape their doom. When Athena approached her father to help her city, Zeus responded that he would grant that "a wall of wood alone shall be uncaptured, a boon to you and your children."

The oracle again advised the Athenians to flee:

Meanwhile, the Spartans also consulted the oracle and were told:

or in a version according to Herodotus:

Agesilaus, the lame king of Sparta, who acceded to the Spartan throne at the time of Lysander, through attacking enemies in every quarter, lost control of the seas to the Persians who attacked Spartan coastal locations. In his obsession with Thebes, he incited the Thebans under Epaminondas to fight back. The Spartans were defeated for the first time by the Thebans in the battle of Leuctra in 371 BC; this led to the invasion of Sparta itself and its defeat at the battle of Mantinea in 362 BC.

359 BC
In 359 BC, Philip II of Macedon consulted the Oracle and was told:

The king then sought to control the silver mines in the neighbouring Thracian and Illyrian kingdom, and using them to bribe his way to early victories, playing one Greek state off against the others, and isolating his enemies by bribes to potential allies.

Philip also had a highly spirited black colt that no one could ride.  The Oracle of Delphi stated whoever could ride this horse would conquer the world, but despite many attempts neither Philip nor any of his generals could mount the horse.  His son Alexander, later to be called Alexander the Great, succeeded, as he realized that the horse was afraid of his own shadow.  Philip gave the horse Bucephalus to Alexander, who took the steed on his conquest of Asia.

In 353 BC, a third Sacred War broke out when Thebes had placed a fine upon Phocis, and Phocis heavily taxed the people of nearby Delphi and seized the Treasury of Delphi to pay for the war. The Amphictyonic League led by Philip declared war against Phocis. Philip sought to unite all Greece with Macedon in the Amphictyonic League to attack Persia.

In 339 BC, Philip interfered once again against the Amphictyonic alliance when the Krissans trespassed on Apollo's sacred grounds. Philip punished the Krissans, and consequently in 338 BC defeated the combined armies of the Athenians and the Spartans, thus becoming the dominant force in Greek affairs.  Eventually, at the Battle of Chaeronea, he was successful against the Athenians and Thebans, but he was assassinated before he could lead the invasion of Persia.

336 BC
Alexander the Great visited the Delphic Oracle wishing to hear a prophecy that he would soon conquer the entire ancient world. To his surprise the oracle refused a direct comment and asked him to come later. Furious, Alexander dragged Pythia by the hair out of the chamber until she screamed "You are invincible, my son!" (ἀνίκητος εἶ ὦ παῖ.). The moment he heard these words he dropped her, saying, "Now I have my answer".

about 300 BC
Diogenes Laërtius recorded that when Zeno of Citium "consulted the oracle, as to what he ought to do to live in the most excellent manner, the God answered him that he ought to become of the same complexion as the dead, on which he inferred that he ought to apply himself to the reading of the books of the ancients. Accordingly, he attached himself to Crates of Thebes...."

279 BC
In 279 BC, plundered by a Celtic invasion, the oracle declared:

The Celts were met by earthquakes, avalanches, and a massive snow storm, forcing them to retreat.  But the Romans were a different matter. In 191 BC, the sanctuary of Delphi fell into the Roman sphere of influence, and the oracle generally supported the rise of Rome henceforth.

Roman Period

83 BC
In 83 BC, Delphi was razed by an attack from the Thracian tribe of Maedi who extinguished the sacred fire which had been burning uninterrupted for centuries. At the time of Pompey the Great, Cicero, Pompey's ally, consulted the Oracle as to how he should find greatest fame and was told:

Pompey was subsequently defeated by Julius Caesar.  Cicero cultivated his oratory and his skills in the courts in preserving Rome from the Catilinarian conspiracy, earning undying fame.

67 AD
In 67 AD, Emperor Nero, who was just 30 years old and had killed his own mother in 59 AD, when visiting the Oracle was told:

The incensed emperor had the Pythia burned alive. Nero thought he would have a long reign and die at 73.  Instead, his reign came to a short end after a revolt by Galba who was 73 years of age at the time.

Before 117 AD
Before 117 AD the Emperor Hadrian visited Delphi before he reached the throne. After drinking from the Castalian Spring, his destiny as Emperor was proclaimed.  When he had acceded to the throne, he ordered it blocked up so no one else could get the same idea in the same way.

302 AD
The Emperor Diocletian on consulting the oracle on the advice of Galerius was told that the sect of Christianity would lead to the destruction of the Empire.  This led to the Diocletianic Persecution where Christians were persecuted for not agreeing to the sacrifices to the Greek and Roman gods. After the Edict of Toleration by Constantine and especially after the reign of Theodosius, Christians retaliated by persecuting the Pythia.

362 AD
Hagiography has it that in 362, on behalf of his emperor Julian the Apostate, Oribasius visited the Delphic oracle, now in a rather desolate state, offering his emperor's services to the temple and, in return, receiving one of the last prophecies by the Delphic Pythia:

Fontenrose doubts the authenticity of this oracle, characterizing it a "Christian oracle, devised to show that the Delphic Apollo foresaw the mission of Christ and the end of Oracles."

See also
 Barnum effect
 Delphic maxims

Notes

References

Parke, H. W., A History of the Delphic Oracle, Basil Blackwell, 1939.
Plutarch, Moralia, tr. Frank Cole Babbitt, Loeb Library Series, Harvard University Press, 1962.

Ancient Greek religion
Classical oracles
Divination
Prophecy
Delphi